J. Joseph Curran (June 28, 1922 – January 28, 2012) was an American college basketball coach.  He coached at Canisius College in Buffalo, New York from 1953 to 1959.

Curran served in the United States Navy during World War II, then attended Canisius, Cornell and Pennsylvania State University after the war – playing basketball at Penn State during the 1943–44 season.

Curran became the coach at Canisius in 1953.  He coached for the Golden Griffins for six seasons, leading them to three consecutive NCAA tournaments in 1955, 1956 and 1957.  Their 79–77 upset of North Carolina State in four overtimes in 1956 is considered one of the biggest upsets in NCAA Tournament history.  Curran's all-time record at Canisius was 76–66.

Joseph Curran died on January 28, 2012.

Head coaching record

References

1922 births
2012 deaths
United States Navy personnel of World War II
Basketball coaches from New York (state)
Basketball players from New York (state)
Canisius College alumni
Canisius Golden Griffins men's basketball coaches
Cornell University alumni
Penn State Nittany Lions basketball players
People from Hornell, New York
American men's basketball players